Stanhope is an unincorporated community within Webster County, Kentucky, United States. It was also known as  Liberty.

References

Unincorporated communities in Webster County, Kentucky
Unincorporated communities in Kentucky